Marzrud or Marz Rood or Marz Rud may refer to:
 Marzrud, East Azerbaijan
 Marzrud, Mazandaran